Robert William Geoffrey Gray (born 23 February 1945) is an Australian poet, freelance writer, and critic. He has been described as "an Imagist without a rival in the English-speaking world" and "one of the contemporary masters of poetry in English".

Biography
Gray was born in Port Macquarie, grew up in Coffs Harbour and was educated in a country town on the north coast of New South Wales.  He trained there as a journalist, and since then has worked in Sydney after settling in the 1970s as an editor, advertising copywriter, reviewer and buyer for bookshops. His first book of poems, Creekwater Journal, was published in 1973.

As a poet Gray is most notable for his keen visual imagery and intensely observed landscapes, known as a very skilful imagist. Les Murray has said about Gray, "[he] has an eye, and the verbal felicity which must accompany such an eye. He can use an epithet and image to perfection and catch a whole world of sensory understanding in a word or a phrase." His wide reading in and experience of East Asian cultures and their varieties of Zen Buddhism is clear in many of the themes and forms he chooses to work in, including, for example haiku-style free verse works, nature style poetry, as well as discursive and narrative style poems, such as "Diptych," (1984). Gray's essentially Australian response to nature is reinforced by what he sees as a commonsensical Eastern view of man as within nature rather than an agent removable from, and capable of controlling nature. Martin Langford has written that Gray's poetry captures the Australian ambivalence towards their own landscapes. "No-one captures better that dual sense of our fascination with the physical world, and our dismay at its indifference." 
 
Gray has been a writer-in-residence at Meiji University in Tokyo and at several schools and universities throughout Australia including Geelong College in 1982. From February–March 2012, Gray lectured at Campion College in New South Wales.

He has won numerous awards including the Adelaide Arts Festival award and the New South Wales and Victorian Premiers' awards for poetry.  In 1990 he received the Patrick White Award.

With Geoffrey Lehmann, he edited two anthologies, The Younger Australian Poets and Australian Poetry in the Twentieth Century, and he is the editor of Selected Poems by Shaw Neilson, and Drawn from Life, the journals of the painter John Olsen. 2008 saw the much anticipated publication of his memoir, The Land I Came Through Last.

In 2012 his collected poems was published under the title Cumulus. As with each of his poetic publications, it includes all that Gray wishes to preserve of his earlier poetry and many newer poems.

Awards
 1986 – New South Wales Premier's Literary Awards Kenneth Slessor Prize for Poetry for Selected Poems 1963–83
 1986 – The Adelaide Festival of the Arts Award
 1986 – The Grace Leven Prize for Poetry
 1990 – Patrick White Award
 1994 – Victorian Premier's Literary Award – C. J. Dennis Prize for Poetry for Certain Things
 2002 – The Age Book of the Year Dinny O'Hearn Poetry Prize for Afterimages
 2002 – Victorian Premier's Literary Award – C. J. Dennis Prize for Poetry for Afterimages
 2011 – Australia Council Writers' Emeritus
 2012 – Philip Hodgins Memorial Prize

Bibliography

Memoir
 The Land I Came Through Last (Giramond, 2008)

Collections
 Cumulus: Collected Poems (John Leonard Press, 2012)
 Nameless Earth (Carcanet, 2006)
 Afterimages (Duffy & Snellgrove, 2002)
 New Selected Poems (Duffy & Snellgrove, 1998)
 Lineations (Duffy & Snellgrove, 1996)
 Certain Things (William Heinemann Australia, 1993)
 Selected Poems (Angus & Robertson, 1990)
 Piano (Angus & Robertson, 1988)
 Selected Poems 1963–1983 (Angus & Robertson, 1985)
 The Skylight (Angus & Robertson, 1984)
 Grass Script (Angus & Robertson, 1979)
 Creekwater Journal (University of Queensland Press, 1974)
 Introspect, Retrospect : Poems (Lyre-Bird Writers, c.1970)

Edited
 Australian Poetry Since 1788 (University of New South Wales Press, 2011) with Geoffrey Lehmann 
 A Spill of Light, A Thrust of Shadow (Youngstreet Poets, 1999)
 Australian Poetry in the Twentieth Century (William Heinemann Australia, 1991) with Geoffrey Lehmann
 Sydney's Poems : A Selection on the Occasion of the City's One Hundred and Fiftieth Anniversary 1842–1992 (Primavera Press, 1992) with Vivian Smith
 Selected Poems / Roland Robinson (Angus & Robertson, 1989)
 The Younger Australian poets (Hale & Iremonger, c1983) with Geoffrey Lehmann

Biography
 The King's Wife : Five Queen Consorts (Secker & Warburg, 1990)

Interviews
"The Sydney Morning Herald"

References
 
Duffy and Snellgrove - Robert Gray
AustLit - Gray, Robert

Australian poets
1945 births
Living people
Patrick White Award winners
Australian male poets